Dampier Strait may refer to either of two different straits with the same name which are located near the same island of New Guinea:
 Dampier Strait (Papua New Guinea)
 Dampier Strait (Indonesia)